The women's 4 × 100 metre medley relay event for the 1976 Summer Olympics was held in Montreal.

Heats
Heat 1

Heat 2

Heat 3

Final

Parenthesis indicate that the athlete competed in preliminary rounds, but not in the final.''

References

External links
Official Olympic Report

Swimming at the 1976 Summer Olympics
1976 in women's swimming
Women's events at the 1976 Summer Olympics